The fourth season of the Danish reality television series Big Brother was produced by Endemol and premiered on January 30, 2012, on Kanal 5. The season was hosted by Marie Egede and lasted 100 days with the winner receiving a prize of 500,000 Danish krones (DKK).

Housemates

Weekly summary
The main events in the Big Brother 2012 House are summarized in the table below. A typical Week began with the shopping task, followed by the nominations, and ended with the eviction of a Housemate during the live Sunday episode. Evictions, tasks, and other events for a particular week are noted.  The diary of happenings in the house are listed in order of sequence. Each week has its own theme.

Nominations table

Notes
 : three housemates entered in the Bunnie House: Clifford, Lasse and Nicolai. There was a competition, and the winner would move to the main house. Clifford won the competition and moved to the main house. The public has to vote to save either Lasse and Nicolai. Nicolai received the fewest votes and was evicted. Lasse moved to the main house.
 : Lesley and Louise were initially up for eviction. On Day 3, Lesley decided to walk, leaving only Louise up for eviction. Then, the housemates had to nominate a replacement for Lesley (in ). Amanda received the most nominations and was up for eviction with Louise.
 : There was a "yes" task. If Big Brother proposes something to them, they have to say "yes". If they say "no", they'll be automatically nominated. Amanda, Mads, Henrik and Line said no, and therefore they were up for eviction.
 : For this week's task, all of the housemates except Guido were split into pairs (Mads & Cathrine, Melander & Alexander, Thomas & Clifford, Christian & Patricia, Umar & Stine, Amanda and Lasse, and Henrik and Michella). If one of the members of the pair wants immunity, the other has to be automatically nominated. Melander decided to accept the immunity, so Alexander was automatically nominated. Then, the public has to vote for their favourite pair. The one with the most votes will be also immune. Henrik and Michella received the most votes, and are immune this week. Then, the housemate had to nominate the other two housemates. The pair with the most votes together will be nominated. Umar and Stine received the most nominations points together, and are up for eviction with Alexander.
 : All girls are immune, as there are more male than female housemates.
 : Christian and Melander were initially up for eviction. On Day 34, Melander decided to walk after Clifford's ejection, leaving only Christian up for eviction. Melander had the power to choose his replacement, and he chose Umar, meaning he is up for eviction with Christian.
 : Patricia, Cathrine and Henrik were banned to nominate, as punishment for discussing nominations.
 : Denise and Mette were immune as they are new housemates. They had to choose another two housemates to be immune, and they chose Michella and Umar.
 : On Day 47, Denise was ejected from the House. The producers decided to replace her with the last evictee, Amanda.
 : Henrik, Cathrine and Mette coordinated the nominations. As punishment, Big Brother told the other housemates to nominate two of them, with 2 and 1 points (in ). Mette and Cathrine received the most points and were nominated with Alexander and Michella.
 : Amanda, Cathrine, Guido and Henrik were all nominated because they refused to take part in this weekly task.
 : Alexander was nominated by a Russian roulette machine during a task. To Amanda and Patricia were given the task to shout instead of talk normally. As they failed this, they were also automatically nominated.
 : Thomas won a competition, and had the power to choose the fourth nominee. After he chooses it, Amanda has the power to give immunity to someone. She gives immunity to Umar. Then, Thomas chose Henrik has the fourth nominee.
 : This week there was a task named "Heaven vs Hell". The housemates in hell will compete in different challenges and those who are in hell on Wednesday will be up for eviction. Cathrine found a key in a haystack and moved to Heaven. Alexander was chosen by the public to move to Heaven. Then, Cathrine was automatically nominated, after open the safety box, who in reality is to move to Hell. Then, the housemates remaining to Hell had to choose 2 of them to move to Heaven. They chose Henrik and Umar. Then, the remaining housemates competed in a challenge. Thomas won it and moved to Heaven. Alexander opened the safety box and was automatically nominated like Cathrine. Then, Amanda and Michella took part in a task where they had to make a puzzle of a devil's face and Michella won, so Amanda is nominated with Cathrine and Alexander.
 : The producers put a symbol in the house, and told them that whoever broke it would win immunity for all the housemates from his or her same gender. Alexander immediately decided to break it, so the 3 guys won immunity and Amanda and Michella were nominated.
 : Eva (a guest who won a competition from a magazine to enter the House) also nominated this week. She nominated Henrik with 2 points and Umar with 1 point.

External links
Official website
World of Big Brother Forum

2012 Danish television seasons
04